David Morales (born 1961) is an American DJ and record producer.

David Morales may also refer to:
 Dave Morales, radio personality, DJ and independent producer
 David Morales (rower) (born 1977), Spanish rower
 David Sánchez Morales (1925–1978), Central Intelligence Agency operative
 David S. Morales (born 1968), American lawyer 
 David Morales (politician), American politician
 David Morales (racing driver) (born 2003), American-Dominican-Argentine racing driver